The Tashkent Television Tower is a  tower, located in Tashkent, Uzbekistan and is the twelfth tallest tower in the world. Construction started in 1978 and it began operation six years later, on 15 January 1985. It was the forth tallest tower in the world from 1985 to 1991. Moreover, the decision of construction Tashkent Tower or TV-Tower of Uzbekistan was decided on 1 September 1971 in order to spread the TV and radio signals to all over the Uzbekistan. It is of a vertical cantilever structure, and is constructed out of steel.  Its architectural design is a product of the Terxiev, Tsarucov & Semashko firm.

It is second tallest structure in Central Asia after Ekibastuz GRES-2 Power Station in Ekibastuz, Kazakhstan. It also belongs to the World Federation of Great Towers.

Use
The main purposes of the tower are radio and TV-transmission. The signal reaches the farthest points of Tashkent Province and some of the south regions of Kazakhstan. The tower is also used for communication between governmental departments, and organizations. The tower also serves as a complex hydrometeorological station.

See also

List of tallest structures in Uzbekistan 
List of tallest structures in Central Asia
List of the world's tallest structures
 List of tallest towers in the world
 List of tallest freestanding structures in the world
 List of tallest freestanding steel structures
 Lattice tower

References

External links 
Online Journal About Tower

 
 

Towers built in the Soviet Union
Towers in Uzbekistan
Buildings and structures in Tashkent
Tourist attractions in Tashkent
Towers completed in 1985
Towers with revolving restaurants
Radio masts and towers
Observation towers
Lattice towers